The Red Thread of Fate, also referred to as the Red Thread of Marriage, and other variants, is an East Asian belief originating from Chinese mythology. It is commonly thought of as an invisible red cord around the finger of those that are destined to meet one another in a certain situation as they are "their true love". According to Chinese legend, the deity in charge of "the red thread" is believed to be Yuè Xià Lǎorén (月下老人), often abbreviated to Yuè Lǎo (月老), the old lunar matchmaker god, who is in charge of marriages. In the original Chinese myth, it is tied around both parties' ankles, while in Japanese culture it is bound from a male's thumb to a female's little finger. Although in modern times it is common across both these cultures to depict the thread being tied around the fingers, often the little finger. The color red in Chinese culture symbolises happiness and it is also prominently featured during Chinese weddings.

The two people connected by the red thread are destined lovers, regardless of place, time, or circumstances. This magical cord may stretch or tangle, but never break. This myth is similar to the Western concept of soulmate or a destined partner.

Folklore 
One story featuring the red thread of fate involves a young boy. Walking home one night, a young boy sees an old man (Yue Lao) standing beneath the moonlight. The man explains to the boy that he is attached to his destined wife by a red thread. Yue Lao shows the boy the young girl who is destined to be his wife. Being young and having no interest in having a wife, the young boy picks up a rock and throws it at the girl, running away. Many years later, when the boy has grown into a young man, his parents arrange a wedding for him. On the night of his wedding, his wife waits for him in their bedroom, with the traditional veil covering her face. Raising it, the man is delighted to find that his wife is one of the great beauties of his village. However, she wears an adornment on her eyebrow. He asks her why she wears it and she responds that when she was a young girl, a boy threw a rock at her that struck her, leaving a scar on her eyebrow. She self-consciously wears the adornment to cover it up. The woman is, in fact, the same young girl connected to the man by the red thread shown to him by Yue Lao back in his childhood, showing that they were connected by the red thread of fate.

Another version of the same story involves an ambitious young man who talks to Yue Lao and insists on asking him about who will he marry, thinking that he'll meet himself a rich girl. Yue Lao points at a poor-looking little girl who's taking a stroll with an old blind woman in a marketplace, shows him a red thread between the two, and tells the man that he'll marry her someday. Displeased, the man tells a servant to kill the two and then leave the village. Years later the man, now a promising public officer, marries a beautiful woman from a rich family who is very much the perfect wife for him save for two details: she has a limp and covers her forehead with a silk patch for undisclosed reasons. He asks his wife why and she begins crying, telling him that she is the niece of the family leaders rather than their daughter: her parents died when she was young and she initially lived with her old blind nanny, but one day a madman stabbed her caretaker to death in a local marketplace and wounded her, leaving her scarred and almost crippled. The man realizes that Yue Lao was right, tearfully confesses that he ordered the attack and asks his wife for forgiveness, which she gives to him.

In another story, a girl has a crush on a boy and decides to declare her love for him. Unfortunately, the boy rejects her and makes fun of her. The girl runs off to a fountain where she meets Yue Lao who tells her they are soul mates. The girl is still fuming and runs off. When the girl becomes a lady, she meets a young man who seems very charming and in other terms familiar to her. She then asks the man for his name and he says the name of the young boy. The lady doesn't seem to realize though and then on their special day, he tells her a girl liked him but he was foolish and made fun of her for it, he then exclaims the girl had the same name as her. Realizing who he was, she admits she was the girl and he eventually apologizes.

See also 
 Yuanfen
 Red string in Kabbalah
 Silver cord
 Yue Lao
 Ōkuninushi
 Kumihimo
 Chinese knotting
 Chinese button knot
 Frog (fastening)

References

Asian culture
Chinese mythology
Philosophy of love